Stade de Sauclières is a stadium in Béziers, France.  It is currently used for football matches and is the home stadium of AS Béziers.  The stadium holds 12,000 spectators.

External links
Stadium information

Sauclieres
Sports venues in Hérault
Sport in Béziers
AS Béziers